Khazar-e Do (also Romanized as Khaẕar-e Do and Kheẕer-e Do) is a village in Shoaybiyeh-ye Gharbi Rural District, Shadravan District, Shushtar County, Khuzestan Province, Iran. At the 2006 census, its population was 96, in 13 families.

References 

Populated places in Shushtar County